On 10 March 2022 at 23:01 CET, an unidentified Soviet-made Tupolev Tu-141 reconnaissance unmanned aerial vehicle (UAV) crashed in Zagreb, the capital of Croatia. With an unidentified operator and unknown destination (as of April 2022), the origin of the drone is presumed to be connected to military actions during the Russian invasion of Ukraine. The drone's flight over Croatia, Hungary and Romania (all three being NATO states) prompted criticism of the defense systems as the UAV was detected but not cleared. In response, the Croatian government restricted airspace over populous cities and received military support from France and the United States who dispatched multiple fighter-jets to Croatia days later for joint exercises.

Technological background 
The Tupolev Tu-141 is a Soviet-made unmanned aerial vehicle (UAV) made in the late 1970s. It weighs almost six tons, and it is launched off a truck where its flight path is also programmed. Analysts describe that after its launch, Tu-141 behaves more like a modern cruise missile than a traditional UAV. When its flight is completed, the aircraft descends to the ground using parachutes so it can be reused. The range of the aircraft is 1,000 km (620 mi, 540 nmi).

Flight and crash 

The unmanned aerial vehicle entered Romanian airspace around 23:23 EET, where it was observed by the Romanian Air Force and flew for 3 minutes. Afterwards, it continued flying through Hungarian airspace for the next 40 minutes at about  altitude, where it was also observed by the Hungarian Air Force. The impact damaged 96 cars parked nearby. It also woke up and upset the students in the Stjepan Radić dormitory.

The Seismological Service of Croatia recorded seismic waves in time of the UAV's impact with an epicenter very close to the actual crash site.

Investigation 
Croatian civil and military police quickly sealed off the crash perimeter. The next morning, American analyst Tyler Rogoway identified the aircraft to most likely be a Soviet era Tupolev Tu-141, which was also corroborated by Cyrillic inscriptions and red star insignia found on the scattered debris near the crash site. There were also several parachutes hanging on the nearby trees. Throughout 12 March, Croatian Army continued the excavation of a remaining major part of the debris, which was wedged into the ground. The debris was taken to a secret location. On the same day, the head of Military police of Chief of Staff of Croatian Army brigadier Vlado Kovačević said that the aircraft's black box was recovered and that some fragments point to the possibility that the aircraft was also carrying an explosive device.

In an interview on 13 March, the Croatian Minister of Defence, Mario Banožić, confirmed that parts belonging to an explosive device were found in the debris of the drone. He also added that the weight of the explosive could have been up to 120 kg.

Prime Minister of Croatia, Andrej Plenković said to the media on 17 March, that the UAV flew all the way to Croatia because Romanian and Hungarian radars did not identify the incoming object as a real threat, due to the fact that there were several false alarms in the days before the incident and it was thought that it was a glitch. Given the fact that neither Romanian or Hungarian radars reported the object, NATO in turn could not order the interception of the UAV.

On 23 March, the Minister of the Interior, Davor Božinović, confirmed that the UAV carried an aerial bomb.

The investigation report was presented on 13 April. A detailed analysis of its metal fragments showed that the drone carrying an OFAB-100-120 aerial bomb hit the ground because of parachute failure, but no traces of military explosives, such as Trinitrotoluene (TNT), were found on it. The bomb was charged by unconventional organic powder. On 1 December 2022, while answering questions in Sabor, Croatian defense minister Mario Banožić said NATO member states whose territories were overflown by the drone had proclaimed the drone operator a state secret.

Reactions

Domestic 
The slow or non-existent reaction from air defence services caused outrage among the Croatian media and public, with some comparing the incident to Mathias Rust's flight to the Red Square in 1987.

President of Croatia, Zoran Milanović, described the crash as "a serious incident" and added on that "in such situations you depend on NATO [...] while there was obviously some failure there". The President said Croatia knew where the drone flew from, "evidently Ukraine to Zagreb".

Prime Minister Plenković said on 12 March that "[t]his is a real threat. NATO and the EU were supposed to react. We will not tolerate such situation [...] we were very lucky. This could have fallen on a nuclear power plant in Hungary." He also said that he wrote a letter to the Secretary General of NATO about the situation.

The Mayor of Zagreb, Tomislav Tomašević, held a press conference saying that "no people were hurt during the impact, but there is some property damage". On 12 March 2022, Tomašević criticized certain unnamed foreign media sources for allegedly misrepresenting the location of the crash site. He stated: "I must admit that I am quite bothered by the information in foreign media sources, where I have read that such a large military aircraft had crashed in the suburbs of Zagreb, or that it had crashed next to Zagreb. No, it did not crash next to Zagreb, it crashed in the centre of Zagreb, in a densely populated area, and it did not crash in any type of suburban area."

The Croatian online newspaper Index.hr suggested the drone may have been meant to fly to a location in Ukraine called , rather than the Zagreb's neighborhood of Jarun which sounds similar.

Distinguished Croatian Air Force pilot Ivan Selak criticized NATO's Combined Air Operations Centre in Torrejón, Spain, for not scrambling Romanian, Hungarian or Croatian Air Force due to the incoming object.

On 12 March, the Croatian daily newspaper Jutarnji list wrote that Croatia might ask the United States to deploy their Patriot missile systems in the country. Croatian military expert and former defence minister deputy, Nikola Brzica, commented: "Armed Forces of Croatia have at least two systems in their inventory, which could have brought down such a simple target, yet they weren't used. [...] It turns out that neither us [Croatians], nor Hungarians, nor Romanians properly tracked that target, nor contacted others and this is a big problem for NATO's air defence".

Foreign 
Ukrainian Defence Minister's adviser Markiyan Lubkivsky in a statement to Croatian media denied that the UAV which crashed in Zagreb belongs to Ukraine. In subsequent reaction to the writing of Russian news agency TASS, State Special Communications Service of Ukraine also further claimed that the UAV's in question are in possession of both Russian and Ukrainian Armed Forces. However, according to them Ukrainian variants of Tu-141 UAVs are marked by Ukrainian coat of arms, while Russian variants have the red star insignia.

The Russian Embassy in Zagreb also denied ownership of the crashed drone, saying that "the drone was produced on the territory of Ukraine" and that Russian Armed Forces had not used such drones since 1991.

Hungarian Minister of Foreign Affairs and Trade, Péter Szijjártó, stated that Hungarian government joined the investigation about the UAV.

The Secretary General of NATO Jens Stoltenberg commented that the drone crashed in Croatia was not an armed attack and not an armed drone.

Aftermath 
A joint exercise with the Croatian Air Force pilots and French pilots of the Rafale fighters from the aircraft carrier Charles de Gaulle was held on 15 March 2022. Flights of Croatian MiGs-21 and French Rafale were conducted in the airspace over Istria and Kvarner, Lika and Kordun, and over the cities of Rijeka, Pula, Zadar, and Zagreb. Later that day, Croatian president and the commander-in-chief of the Armed Forces of Croatia, Zoran Milanović, published a statement that said he had given an order to the Chief of the General Staff of the Armed Forces of Croatia, Admiral Robert Hranj, whereby overflights of military aircraft over Zagreb and the country's other cities would be "strictly forbidden". On 16 March 2022, the United States dispatched two F-16 fighter jets from Italy to a Croatian airbase in Pleso.

On 17 March 2022, Ukrainian Minister of Defence Oleksii Reznikov continued to insist that Ukrainians were "not the ones who launched that drone towards Croatia"; he also expressed incomprehension of NATO's apparent failure to prevent the incident, saying: "The drone flew over several member states. How come you didn't see it? Why didn't you destroy it? Can you cover your own airspace?".

Other flying incidents during the week

Suspicious flying objects over Hungary 
The Hungarian Air Force first detected and tracked the aircraft that passed through Romanian airspace late in the evening of March 10th. It turned out to be a drone that crashed in Zagreb. The Air Force further detected another suspicious radar signal a day later on 11 March around noon. Hungarian Gripen fighters took off from Kecskemét air base but found no suspicious flying object. The third case occurred during the afternoon with the same reaction and the same outcome.

Drone crash in Romania 
On 13 March, just three days after the event in Zagreb, a drone crashed in the Tărpiu village close to the Transylvanian city of Bistrița in Romania. Unlike the UAV that crashed in Croatia, this one carried no armament. It was identified as a Russian Orlan-10 reconnaissance drone. Like Croatia, Romania is also a NATO member, and as such is under its security umbrella.

See also 

 List of accidents and incidents involving military aircraft (2020–present)
 List of UAV-related incidents
 2022 missile explosion in Poland
 1989 Belgium MiG-23 crash

References 

March 2022 events in Croatia
2020s in Zagreb
Aviation history of Croatia
2022 in aviation
Events affected by the 2022 Russian invasion of Ukraine
2022 in Hungary
2022 in Romania
Croatia–Russia relations
Hungary–Russia relations
Romania–Russia relations